An amphibious assault ship is a type of amphibious warfare ship employed to land and support ground forces on enemy territory by an amphibious assault. The design evolved from aircraft carriers converted for use as helicopter carriers (and, as a result, are often mistaken for conventional fixed-wing aircraft carriers). Modern ships support amphibious landing craft, with most designs including a well deck. Coming full circle, some amphibious assault ships also support V/STOL fixed-wing aircraft, now having a secondary role as aircraft carriers.

The role of the amphibious assault ship is fundamentally different from that of a standard aircraft carrier: its aviation facilities have the primary role of hosting helicopters to support forces ashore rather than to support strike aircraft. However, some are capable of serving in the sea-control role, embarking aircraft like Harrier or the new F-35B variant of the Lightning II fighters for combat air patrol and helicopters for anti-submarine warfare or operating as a safe base for large numbers of STOVL fighters conducting air support for an expeditionary unit ashore. Most of these ships can also carry or support landing craft, such as air-cushioned landing craft (hovercraft) or LCUs.

The largest fleet of these types is operated by the United States Navy, including the  dating back to 1989 and the very similar  ships that entered service in 2014.  Just as an aircraft carrier leads a carrier strike group in the US Navy, an amphibious assault ship leads an expeditionary strike group.  Amphibious assault ships are also operated by the Royal Australian Navy, the Brazilian Navy, the Chinese People's Liberation Army Navy, the Egyptian Navy, the French Navy, the Italian Navy, the Republic of Korea Navy (South Korea) and the Spanish Navy.

The term amphibious assault ship is often used interchangeably with other ship classifications. It applies to all large-deck amphibious ships such as the landing platform helicopter (LPH), landing helicopter assault (LHA), and landing helicopter dock (LHD).

History

World War II

In the Pacific theater of World War II, escort carriers would often escort the landing ships and troop carriers during the island-hopping campaign. In this role, they would provide air cover for the troopships as well as fly the first wave of attacks on the beach fortifications in amphibious landing operations. On occasion, they would even escort the large carriers, serving as emergency airstrips and providing fighter cover for their larger sisters while these were busy readying or refueling their own planes. They would also transport aircraft and spare parts from the US to the remote island airstrips.

The Imperial Japanese Army had its own special army ships being similar to aircraft carriers of the Imperial Japanese Navy: they were landing craft carriers that carried both landing craft and aircraft, and the plan was to launch the aircraft at the same time as the landing crafts carrying the troops, and to use them for combat air patrol, aerial reconnaissance and close air support. First,  ( or ), completed in 1934 as the world's first purpose-built landing ship, was designed to launch aircraft, but it did not have the facilities for landing. However, the Japanese were already in a state of defeat, and the ship was eventually not used as an aircraft carrier until it was sunk in the fall of 1944. With the deployment of the 8,000-ton Shinshū Maru and a further refinement, the 9,000-ton Akitsu Maru (1941), the Japanese amphibious forces had in hand prototypes for all-purpose amphibious ships. Today the U.S. Navy and Marines use this fundamental concept to the exclusion of all others in their LHA and LHD class amphibious assault carriers. In 1937, British and American observers watched Shinshū Maru  at work off Shanghai and immediately recognized a significant development in amphibious warfare. Shinshū Maru carried landing craft in a well deck that could be flooded, which allowed the landing craft to float free from an open stern gate. The ship could also hold additional craft on davits, but her next most impressive function was an ability to discharge vehicles from a deck-level parking garage directly onto a pier. The ship also carried two catapults for aircraft but did not embark operational seaplanes. She could, however, transport and unload aircraft if necessary, a capability further developed with Akitsu Maru, which even had a short take-off flight deck.

Post-World War II
Despite all the progress that was seen during World War II, there were still fundamental limitations in the types of coastline that were suitable for assault. Beaches had to be relatively free of obstacles, and have the right tidal conditions and the correct slope. However, the development of the helicopter fundamentally changed the equation. The first use of helicopters in an amphibious assault came during the invasion of Egypt during the Suez War in 1956.

The techniques were developed further by American forces during the Vietnam War and refined during training exercises. The modern amphibious assault can take place at virtually any point of the coast, making defending against them extremely difficult.

Most early amphibious assault ships were converted from small aircraft carriers. As well as the two  light aircraft carriers converted for use in the Suez War, the Royal Navy converted the  carriers  and  into "commando carriers" during the 1950s. Their sister ship  was also converted to a commando carrier in the early 1970s, but was restored to aircraft carrier operations before the end of the 1970s.

In the early 1950s the United States Navy and Marine Corps tested the concept of airborne amphibious operations from aircraft carriers. In 1955 the  escort carrier  was converted to an assault helicopter carrier (CVHA-1), ultimately re-designated LPH-6 in 1959. They are sometimes referred to as the Boxer class after the lead ship in the series. These provided a valuable interim during the construction from 1959 to 1970 of the full complement of seven new  ships designed specifically for the landing platform helicopter role.

Later amphibious assault craft were constructed for the role. The United States Navy constructed the Tarawa class of five landing helicopter assault ships, which began to enter service from the late 1970s, and the Wasp class of eight landing helicopter dock ships, the first of which was commissioned in 1989. The United States Navy is also designing a new class of assault ships: the first  ship entered service in October 2014.

Other nations have built amphibious assault ships; the French , South Korea's , and Spain's  are all currently active, while Australia has two  ships based on the Spanish design.

Most modern amphibious assault ships have a well deck (docking well), allowing them to launch landing craft in rougher seas than a ship that has to use cranes or a stern ramp. The US Navy hull classification symbols differ among these vessels, depending on, among other things, their facilities for aircraft: a modern landing ship dock (LSD) has a helicopter deck, a landing platform dock (LPD) also has a hangar, and a landing helicopter dock (LHD) or landing helicopter assault (LHA) has a full-length flight deck with internal aviation facilities for both rotary and fixed wing craft below deck.

Design

Due to their aircraft carrier heritage, all amphibious assault ships resemble aircraft carriers in design. The flight deck is used to operate attack and utility helicopters for landing troops and supplies and on some ship types also launch and recover fixed wing aircraft such as V/STOL Harrier "jump jet"s to provide air support to landing operations. STOL aircraft such as the North American Rockwell OV-10 Bronco were sometimes deployed on large-deck amphibious assault ships and were able to perform short take-offs and landings without needing catapults or arresting wires, although for safety and clearance reasons landings were most often not permitted. Landing craft are also carried, either on deck-mounted davits, or in an internal well dock (USN: "well deck").

List of types

Commando carrier
Centaur-class aircraft carrier (UK) - retired
HMS Hermes (R12)  (UK) - restored to full carrier, in service with the Indian Navy from 1986 as INS Viraat until 2017
 Landing helicopter assault (LHA)
  (United States) – Retired
  (United States)
 Landing helicopter dock (LHD)
  (Australia)
 Type 075 (China)
 Juan Carlos I (Spain)
  (France and Egypt)
   (United States)
  (Italy) – Under sea trial
  (Turkey) – Under sea trial
 Project 23900 (Russia) – Under construction
Landing platform helicopter (LPH)
  (South Korea)
  (Brazil), formerly HMS Ocean
  (United States) – Retired

See also
 Amphibious Assault Ship Project
 Amphibious assault submarine – theoretical type
 Aviation-capable naval vessels
 List of amphibious warfare ships
 Mobile offshore base

References

Bibliography

External links
 In-depth look at various classes